Arapahoe Basin (often shortened to A-Basin, or simply The Basin) is an alpine ski area in the Rocky Mountains of the United States, in the Arapaho National Forest of Colorado. Arapahoe Basin is known for its extended season—usually staying open until early June, and sometimes into early July, whereas most other northern ski areas close in early April. Arapahoe Basin is located south of Loveland Pass on U.S. Highway 6 in Summit County.

Geography and climate
Due to its high elevation (at tree line) and its mostly north-to-northeast face, the Basin's ski season is much longer than most resorts in North America. It often begins its ski operations in mid-October and continues to run lifts until June, making it one of the first resorts to open and often the last one to close.

Arapahoe Basin is located just below Loveland Pass and offers views of the Continental Divide (which it borders) from the lifts. From the top of the East Wall and the North Pole, there are views of Lake Dillon, Breckenridge, Keystone, Montezuma, and Loveland Pass.

Ski area information

Lodges
A-Basin has three day lodges. At the base is a full cafeteria, bar, and coffee bar. There is also a grill outside for warm days, and a food truck style taco bar.  The Black Mountain Lodge sits mid-mountain, at the top of the Black Mountain Express, serving Barbecue and a day lodge style menu. New for 2018-2019, Il Rifugio at the previously unused Snow Plume Refuge building is an Italian bistro, specializing in wine, cheese and charcuterie. It is located at just over 12,500 feet at the summit of A-Basin. Due to complex logistics, most cooked food would have to be brought up the mountain to the restaurant. 

There is no overnight lodging at Arapahoe Basin. The nearest lodging is located at the Keystone ski area, 6 mi. west.

Terrain

Arapahoe Basin is mostly known for advanced and expert terrain, but also has runs for the novice and intermediate skier, as well as a children's program. The Black Mountain Express(an adjustable highspeed detachable quad), Molly Hogan, and  Pika Place & Hogan's Magic Carpet (both surface conveyors) lifts, service easy runs. 

Pika Place is conveniently located close to the base area lodge and is a carpet conveyor for kids and never-evers.

Hogan's Magic Carpet, on the bunny slope, is conveniently located adjacent to the closest base area parking area. It is for beginners getting prepared to ride the nearby Molly Hogan chair lift.

Molly Hogan is a slow lift running over the bunny slope, for use by those just learning to ride a chair lift. 

Black Mountain Express services greens, blues, and four blacks: The Gulch which runs parallel to Black Mountain Express; Exhibition which runs under the chair and features bumps, steep terrain, and a fair number of jumps; "Lower Standard", & "Lower International" which can be accessed from the standard race traverse. 

The Pallavicini lift services mostly black and double black terrain on the west side of the mountain, though it is possible to take some difficult blues back to the base and to ski the "WestWall". The Pallavicini face itself, a group of very steep and seemingly endless mogul runs, is rated double black diamond extreme. It provides gated access to Steep Gullies.
 
The Lenawee lift takes skiers to the top of the mountain, where they can access blues, blacks, and the East and West Walls. On the West Wall there is a blue called Cornice Run where skiers can take leaps from windblown cornices. The East Wall has some of the most difficult terrain at Arapahoe Basin. The Lower East Wall is rated black diamond and can be reached without hiking. Open primarily in late winter and spring, the Upper East Wall is rated double black diamond extreme and is only accessible on foot. A hike of approximately 30 minutes will take guests to the North Pole, a very steep descent through rocky terrain over avalanche-blasted territory. Along the ridge prior to the North Pole is a group of chutes accessed through notches in the cliff band. One chute actually requires some rock downclimbing to reach skiable snow, an interesting experience in ski boots while holding a pair of skis. These chutes are often only a couple of ski widths wide and require mountaineering skiing ability. Most of the terrain is prone to avalanches and is regularly blasted by the ski patrol before they declare the wall open. The Lower and Upper East Wall is bisected by the East Wall Traverse which is quite long and accesses a lot of difficult-to-reach territory from above and below, leaving prime snow conditions available for those willing to make the trek. The entire East Wall is not groomed and should not be taken lightly since evacuation by the ski patrol in this area is a difficult undertaking.

The Zuma lift services blue, black and double black trails over the backside of Arapahoe Basin in "Montezuma Bowl".  Montezuma Bowl offers everything from groomed intermediate runs to advanced cornice runs. It has mostly southern exposure.

The "Beavers Area" is 468 acres of terrain serviced by a fixed grip quad. It is a bowl to the northwest of Pallavinci, with blue and black rated runs. The full terrain includes open powder bowls, tree skiing, and rocky chutes, as well as two intermediate groomed runs.

Expansion
The Steep Gullies was included in the opening of the "Beavers Area" and has the most challenging skiing at Arapahoe Basin. These steep, narrow chutes vary in pitch and width, and are rated as "extreme" (double-black diamond). All terrain in The Steep Gullies is designated as "hike back," meaning that guests must hike or skin back to the bottom of the Pallavicini Lift upon completion of their run.

History
Larry and Marnie Jump, Max Dercum, and Sandy Shaufler started Arapahoe Basin in 1945. The first year it was open for skiing was 1946. Since then, it has expanded to include 147 trails served by 9 lifts. The ski area was sold in the 1970s to Joe Jankovsky. He in turn sold the area to Ralston Purina. 

Arapahoe Basin became the first ski resort in the United States to open for the 2006–2007 season on October 13, when it opened one lift and one run.} It was the first time in seven seasons that Arapahoe Basin beat Loveland ski area in the race to be the first ski area open in the nation. It repeated for the 2007–2008 ski area by opening at 9:00 a.m. on October 10. This was the area's earliest opening in 61 years and the earliest opening in North America for the season.

During the 2007–2008 season, Arapahoe Basin expanded into Montezuma Bowl, with the largest terrain expansion in the nation for that season. Facing southwest towards Keystone, the terrain offers blue, black, and double black trails with all kinds of terrain, including: groomed runs, chutes, glades, and cornice runs, all accessible from the Zuma fixed grip quad. The terrain will be open each season between late December and early January through late April, conditions warranted.

Arapahoe Basin opened for the 2009–2010 season on Friday, October 9, the earliest start in its history.

In 2010, Leitner-Poma replaced the Exhibition lift on the lower mountain with a high speed quad, the Black Mountain Express lift, Arapahoe Basin's first detachable lift.

In the 2015-2016 ski season for the second time in history both Loveland Ski Area and Arapahoe Basin opened on the same day. Loveland opened at 8:30am and Arapahoe Basin at 9am on October 29, 2015. The first time both resorts opened on the same day was the 2008-2009 season.(see comments for reference)

In November 2016, 468 acres were approved by the Forest Service and added to the ski area. Of those 468 acres, 329 opened for the 2017-2018 season; 232 in the Beavers section and 129 in the Steep Gullies section. Currently, the terrain is accessible by a 30-minute hike and is expert and extreme terrain only. A fixed-grip quad chair lift was built in the summer of 2018. 
Opening date for 2016-2017 Season announced on Wednesday, October 19, 2016 with First Chair at 9:00am on Friday, October 21, 2016.

In February 2019, Arapahoe Basin announced it was ending its 20+ year partnership with Vail Resorts and its Epic Pass at the end of the 2018-19 season. On August 2 2019, Arapahoe Basin announced it would join the Ikon Pass starting with the 2019-2020 winter season.

Statistics

Elevation
Lowest in-bounds point: 10,520 ft (3,207 m)
Base:  
Summit: 
Vertical rise: 2,530 ft (771 m)

Trails
Skiable area: 
Trails: 145 total (7%  easiest, 20%  intermediate, 49%  advanced, 24%  expert)
Longest run: 
Average annual snowfall:

Lifts
9 total
1 high-speed detachable quad (Black Mountain Express)
3 fixed grip quad chairs (Zuma Lift, Beavers Lift, Molly Hogan Lift)
1 high-speed detachable 6 pack (Lenawee Express)
1 double chair (Pallavicini Lift)
2 conveyor lifts (Molly's Magic Carpet, Pika Place)
1 rope tow (Lazy J Tow)

Resort Historical Opening and Closing Dates During Snowmaking Era

Arapahoe Basin and Loveland compete yearly for the #RaceToOpen. Ski enthusiasts from around the world watch to see who will open first. Below are the opening dates during the Snowmaking Era.

Season Open Date (Day of Week)
2003-2004 October 30 (Thursday)
2004-2005 October 22 (Friday)
2005-2006 October 23 (Friday)
2006-2007 October 13 (Friday)
2007-2008 October 10 (Wednesday)
2008-2009 October 15 (Wednesday)
2009-2010 October 9  (Friday) *Earliest opening
2010-2011 October 25 (Monday)
2011-2012 October 13 (Thursday)
2012-2013 October 17 (Wednesday)
2013-2014 October 13 (Sunday)
2014-2015 October 17 (Friday)
2015-2016 October 29 (Thursday)
2016-2017 October 21 (Friday)
2017-2018 October 13 (Friday)
2018-2019 October 19 (Friday)
2019-2020 October 11 (Friday)
2020-2021 November 9 (Monday)
2021-2022 October 17 (Sunday)
2022-2023 October 23 (Sunday)

Zuma Bowl Opening and Closing Dates
Season Open Date Close Date Total Days Open for Zuma Bowl
2007-8 January 12, 2008 - May 22, 2008 - 132 Days
2008-9 December 30, 2008 - May 14, 2009 - 136 Days
2009-10 February 24, 2010 - May 16, 2010 - 82 Days
2010-11 December 18, 2010 - June 5, 2011 - 170 Days
2011-12 February 24, 2012 - March 25, 2012 - 31 Days
2012-13 February 13, 2013 - May 27, 2013 - 104 Days
2013-14 January 10, 2014 - June 1, 2014 - 143 Days
2014-15 December 29, 2014 - June 3, 2015 - 157 Days
2015-16 December 23, 2015 - June 3, 2016 - 164 Days
2016-17 December 23, 2016 - June 3, 2017 - 164 Days
2017-18 January 13, 2018 - May 16, 2018
2018-19 December 7, 2018 - TBD
2019-20 Closed EARLY DUE TO COVID, Reopened partial mountain with reservations June 1st.
2020-21 - TBD
2021-22 TBD - May 7th

Benchmark Dates
Earliest opening - October 9, 2009
Latest Closing - August 10, 1995
The installation of snowmaking in 2002 changed the opening from a mid-November/mid-December date to mid-October.
Longest Season - 2018-2019. That season had 258 operating days lasting from October 19, 2018 through July 4, 2019.
In the past 22 seasons (data from 2015)
East Wall opened 6 times in January
East Wall opened 6 times in February
East Wall opened 8 times in March
East Wall did not open during 2 dry years
Those years include the 2001-2002 snow year and the 2011-2012 snow year

References

External links

 
 Colorado Avalanche Information Center

Buildings and structures in Summit County, Colorado
Geography of Summit County, Colorado
Ski areas and resorts in Colorado
Tourist attractions in Summit County, Colorado
White River National Forest